The 2013 ICO Crossminton World Championships was a crossminton tournament, taking place in Berlin, Germany, between 13 and 15 June 2013. With the 1st Crossminton World Championships being played in 2011 and the competition taking place every two years, the 2013 World Championships was the 2nd ICO Crossminton World Championships ever being played. 479 players from 29 countries participated at the event that took place at a time when crossminton was still named speed badminton.

Venue 
The tournament, organised by Speedminton GmbH and International Speed Badminton Organisation, was played on outdoor tennis clay courts of the Steffi-Graf-Stadion in Berlin.

Medal summary

Medalists

Junior Tournament Medalists

Senior Tournament Medalists

Participating nations

References

External links 
Slovenian press
Slovenian press
Swiss press
German press
Hungarian press

Badminton tournaments in Germany
Sports competitions in Berlin
2013 in German sport